Manda is an island of the Lamu Archipelago of Kenya, known for the prosperous 9th century ports of Takwa and Manda town.  The island is now linked by ferry to Lamu and is home to Manda Airport, while Manda Toto island lies to its west. The island is separated from the mainland by the narrow Mkanda channel.

Both Manda town and Takwa were probably abandoned due to lack of water in the first half of the 19th century. In the 1960s the Kenya Department of Agriculture recommended building several concrete catchments called jabias to capture rain water on the island. Two jabias were built and many families moved onto the island, farming maize, cassava, simsim and cotton.

Manda town

History 
The Manda town ruins (on the Northwest coast of Manda Island), were first explored by the archaeologist Neville Chittick in 1965. The town owes its origins to trade with the Persian Gulf during 9th and 10th centuries . The chief trading commodity was probably elephant ivory. mangrove poles were probably also important. Early inhabitants of Manda constructed buildings with burnt square brick and stone and set with a lime mortar. These building techniques are found only on islands and coastal areas of Kenya. This brick and mortar technology is unique to the previously mentioned areas whereas the bricks averaging about 18 cm (7") (which "match perfectly ...in measure") are unique for East Africa for this period, and are likely to have been brought in from Sohar, in modern-day Oman. These bricks probably arrived on Manda Island as ballast in sailing ships entering the port. From the mid-9th century to the early 11th century buildings were also constructed from coral known as coral rag cut from dead coral reefs.

The large scale excavations in 1966, 1970, and 1978 revealed an prosperity unrivaled in East Africa for the period. Signs of this prosperity include Chinese porcelain dating from the ninth century onward, Islamic pottery and glass, and local pottery dated by the associated imports. . Chittick defines 7 periods for occupation of Manda Island: Mid-9th to early 11th century, Mid-11th to late 13th century, late 13th to 14th century, 15th and early 16th century, Mid-16th to 17th century, and Post-seventeenth century. A striking feature of the town are large sea walls built sometime between the 9th century to the 13th century. The walls parallel the shore and are built from large coral blocks. These walls were likely constructed to reclaim sections of the shoreline. Running parallel with the sea with returns running inland, these walls built from large coral blocks are deduced to have been constructed partly to reclaim sections of the shore, and partly to consolidate the edges of the peninsula.

In the July 2013 issue of Archeology it was reported that a Chinese "Yongle Tongbao" cash coin was found on Manda Island, illustrating the reach of Chinese explorers and traders. The coin was issued during the reign of the Yongle Emperor, Zhu Di which lasted until 1424.

Manda prospered until the 13th century when it began to decline.

Takwa

The Takwa Ruins was a town in the period 1500-1700, and it was designated a Kenyan National Monument in 1982.

Manda Airport
 
Manda Airport is the only civilian airport in the Lamu Archipelago.

See also
Historic Swahili Settlements
Swahili architecture

Notes

References
Chittick, Neville: MANDA: Excavations at an Island Port on the Kenya Coast. British Institute In Eastern Africa, 1984 
Martin, Chryssee MacCasler Perry and Esmond Bradley Martin:  Quest for the Past. An historical guide to the Lamu Archipelago. 1973.

Further reading
Wilson, Thomas H.: Takwa: An Ancient Swahili Settlement of the Lamu Archipelago.  Kenya Museum Society.

Swahili people
Swahili city-states
Swahili culture
Lamu Archipelago
Populated places in Coast Province
Archaeological sites in Kenya
Coastal islands of Kenya
Former populated places in Kenya
Archaeological sites of Eastern Africa
Archaeological history of Eastern Africa